Gümülcineli İsmail Hakkı Bey (1877 – 1942) was a liberal politician in the late Ottoman Empire, who was a member of the Liberal Union.

References 

1877 births
1942 deaths
20th-century Turkish politicians
Istanbul University Faculty of Law alumni
People from Komotini
Politicians of the Ottoman Empire